The 38th FIE Fencing World Cup began in October 2008 and concluded in October 2009 at the 2009 World Fencing Championships held in Antalya, Turkey.

Individual Épée

Individual Foil

Individual Sabre

Team Épée

Team Foil

Team Sabre

References 
 FIE rankings

Fencing World Cup
2008 in fencing
2009 in fencing
International fencing competitions hosted by Turkey
2016 in Turkish sport